"She Will Be Loved" is a song by American pop rock band Maroon 5. It was written by frontman Adam Levine and lead guitarist James Valentine. The song was released on June 21, 2004, as the third single from Maroon 5's 2002 debut studio album, Songs About Jane. The single peaked at  5 in the United States and by December 2012 had sold more than 2,722,000 digital downloads. It peaked at No. 4 in the United Kingdom. In Australia, it reached No. 1, a position it held for five non-consecutive weeks. The single is noted for its music video starring Kelly Preston in a mother-daughter love triangle with lead singer Adam Levine.

The song proved as successful as the band's previous hits, "This Love" and "Harder to Breathe", hitting No. 1 on the Mainstream Top 40 and Adult Top 40 charts, but it prompted many alternative radio outlets to remove Maroon 5 from their playlists, on the ground that the band's newer songs were too light for alt-rock audiences. These stations continued to play "Harder to Breathe" and "This Love", but Maroon 5's newer hits were played only on pop and adult contemporary stations. As of June 2014, the song has sold more than 3.5 million copies in the United States.

Music videos

Scrapped version 
The first video for "She Will Be Loved" was later scrapped to re-shoot with the new version. In the video, Maroon 5 performed the song in a house with scenes of them rotating, similar to the band's other video for "Harder to Breathe". The band themselves wearing outfits similar to the ones in the single's cover art.

Official version 
The second music video for "She Will Be Loved" premiered on MTV's TRL, on July 16, 2004. Directed by Sophie Muller, with original sequence by Johanna Bautista (Sweetheart Massive Attack) tells a sad love story, featuring a lovelorn socialite (Kelly Preston) and her rich, deadbeat, abusive husband (John Colton), whose relationship is juxtaposed with that of their daughter's (Corinne Carrey) relationship with a young man (portrayed by Adam Levine). The younger man, however, constantly obsesses over his girlfriend's mother, understanding that, although she is constantly rejected by her husband and that her life is one of emotional anxiety, she is nonetheless beautiful and attractive, and possibly more so than his own girlfriend.

The video is often compared to the 1967 film The Graduate, as it has similarities with the storyline between the daughter, the boyfriend and the mother. Adam Levine explained about the video: "Maybe take some beautiful shots from that movie, which is one of our favorite movies of all time". The music video was uploaded on the band's YouTube channel on June 16, 2009. The version of the song used in the video is the radio mix version found on the 10th anniversary edition of Songs About Jane. As of September 2022, the video has received over 667 million views.

Live version
The band was invited to play the song at the request of George Lucas for his AFI Life Achievement Award ceremony. They were his daughters' favorite artists. The band was introduced by actor Jimmy Smits.

Reception

Commercial performance 
"She Will Be Loved" entered the Billboard Hot 100 at No. 50 as the Hot Shot debut of the week on July 24, 2004. The song rose to No. 20 on August 21, 2004, giving Maroon 5 its third consecutive Top 20 hit on the chart. "She Will Be Loved" continued to gain in performance and rose to No. 9 on September 11, 2004, becoming Maroon 5's second top-ten hit from Songs About Jane after the band's previous hit "This Love". The song reached its peak position at No. 5 on September 25, 2004, matching the peak position of "This Love" from earlier that year. It fell to No. 6 a week later and stayed in that position for three weeks, before rising back up to No. 5 on October 23, 2004, for two more consecutive weeks. "She Will Be Loved" was certified platinum on April 18, 2011, by the Recording Industry Association of America (RIAA) and has sold 3,558,083 copies in the US as of June 15, 2014. It was certified four-times platinum on September 13, 2018. Outside the US, the single reached number one in Australia, Belgium, Mexico, and Venezuela.

Critical reception 
"She Will Be Loved" is widely considered to be one of the band's best songs. In 2022, Billboard and American Songwriter both ranked the song number five on their lists of the 10 greatest Maroon 5 songs.

Awards and achievements 
In 2005, the song was nominated at the 47th Annual Grammy Awards in the Best Pop Performance by a Duo or Group with Vocals category.

Other versions 
Two different versions of the song were featured: an acoustic version that appeared on Maroon 5's live album 1.22.03.Acoustic (2004), and a Cuban version from the album Rhythms del Mundo: Cuba (2006).

Track listings 

Promotional single
 "She Will Be Loved" (radio edit) – 3:59

Australian CD single
 "She Will Be Loved" (radio edit) – 3:59
 "This Love" (Kanye West remix)" – 3:42
 "Closer" (live acoustic version) – 4:30

Europe CD single
 "She Will Be Loved" (radio edit) – 3:59
 "She Will Be Loved" (album version) – 4:17

UK CD single
 "She Will Be Loved" (radio edit) – 3:59
 "She Will Be Loved" (live acoustic version) – 4:39

German maxi-single and UK CD single 2
 "She Will Be Loved" (album version) – 4:36*
 "This Love" (live acoustic version) – 4:36
 "This Love" (Kanye West remix) – 3:42
 "She Will Be Loved" (video) – 4:26

US 12-inch vinyl
 "She Will Be Loved" (radio edit) – 3:59
 "Sunday Morning" (album version) – 4:06

Charts

Weekly charts

Year-end charts

Decade-end charts

All-time charts

Certifications

Release history

Notes

References 

2000s ballads
2002 songs
2004 singles
A&M Octone Records singles
American soft rock songs
J Records singles
Maroon 5 songs
Music videos directed by Sophie Muller
Number-one singles in Australia
Rock ballads
Songs about domestic violence
Songs written by Adam Levine
Songs written by James Valentine (musician)